The 12-episode anime television series  was developed by Studio Deen from the Namco game and was broadcast on TBS in Japan in 2004. The series was originally licensed and released in North America by ADV Films in three DVD volumes beginning in 2005 and in DVD collections in 2009. In 2013 Sentai Filmworks licensed the series, released a complete DVD collection of all twelve episodes of the ADV Films English version and posted the episodes for streaming from the Anime Network online streaming site.

Plot summary
On his 16th birthday, Tomokazu Mikuri had a realistic dream where he sees a girl battling a giant floating monstrosity. When he wakes up, he is surprised that the girl is actually sleeping next to him! Whenever he sleeps from now on, he ends up back at the dream world, and more and more people that he knows keep showing up there too. He finds out from a mysterious masked woman in the dream world named Silk that they are fighting against one named Faydoom, and he is the one who provides the powers to those girls so that they can fight these monsters.

Episode list

The runtime for the TV episodes is approximately 24 minutes.

See also
List of Yumeria characters

References

External links
 Anime Network - Watch - Yumeria
 

Yumeria